Matías Sarulyte (born March 13, 1989 in Colón, Argentina) is an Argentine footballer currently playing for Estudiantes de La Plata.

Teams
 Estudiantes de La Plata 2012–
 → Olimpo (loan) 2013–2014
 → Arsenal de Sarandí (loan) 2014–2016

Titles
 Estudiantes de La Plata 2009 (Copa Libertadores de América), 2010 (Torneo Apertura Primera División Argentina Championship)

References
 Profile at BDFA
 

1989 births
Living people
Argentine footballers
Olimpo footballers
Estudiantes de La Plata footballers
Argentine Primera División players

Association footballers not categorized by position
Sportspeople from Buenos Aires Province